William Leon Clark (1911 – March 19, 2005) was Deputy Chief of Chaplains of the United States Air Force.

Biography
Clark was born in Mississippi in 1911 and grew up in Hattiesburg and Petal. He attended Pearl River Community College, Mississippi College, Southwestern Baptist Theological Seminary and New Orleans Baptist Theological Seminary and became an ordained Baptist pastor.

Military career
Clark originally joined the United States Army in 1941. During World War II, he served with the Third Air Force, Fifth Air Force and V Bomber Command. He left active duty following the war.

In 1951, he was re-called to active duty in the United States Air Force during the Korean War. Following the war, he was assigned to the Office of the United States Secretary of Defense as executive director of the Armed Forces Chaplains Board. Later, he was assigned to the Office of the Chief of Chaplains of the United States Air Force as chief of the Personnel Division.

He was promoted to brigadier general and was named Deputy Chief of Chaplains in 1966. Later, he became Command Chaplain of the United States Southern Command. Clark's retirement was effective as of January 1, 1970.

References

1911 births
2005 deaths
People from Hattiesburg, Mississippi
United States Air Force generals
United States Army officers
World War II chaplains
United States Army personnel of World War II
United States Air Force personnel of the Korean War
Mississippi College alumni
Pearl River Community College alumni
Southwestern Baptist Theological Seminary alumni
New Orleans Baptist Theological Seminary alumni
20th-century Baptist ministers from the United States
People from Petal, Mississippi
Baptists from Mississippi